"Pull Harder on the Strings of Your Martyr" (often shortened to "Pull Harder" or simply "Martyr") is a song by heavy metal band Trivium. It appears on their 2005 album Ascendancy and was released as the album's second single in the same year. Metal Hammer named it "one of the decade’s biggest metal anthems".

Live performance
This song used to be played as the last song in a Trivium live set, however, since 2011, they have finished with either the Shogun single "Throes of Perdition" or "In Waves" from the album of the same name. During the Ascendancy tours, the song's verse was screamed, but for a short stint of the tours after The Crusade, the song was sung live in a raspy clean voice as opposed to the recorded version. Since the release of Shogun, the song has returned to its original vocals when performed live.

At the Roadrunner United 25th anniversary concert back in December 2005, Trivium performed this song live with Machine Head's Robb Flynn on vocals. That concert was released as a DVD called The All-Star Sessions, along with a documentary.

Meaning
Vocalist and songwriter Matt Heafy has described that "Pull Harder on the Strings of Your Martyr" "is a look at a villainous tyrant; one who can simply kill and destroy on will, push his faith upon all, be hated by all other powers around - and still be loved by many that he rules."

Usage in media
 The song is featured on the soundtrack for the 2005 movie, The Cave.

Track listing

Personnel 
Matt Heafy – lead vocals, guitars
Corey Beaulieu – guitars, backing vocals
Paolo Gregoletto – bass guitar, backing vocals
Travis Smith – drums, percussion

Additional personnel
Jason Suecof – guitar solo

References

External links
 

2005 singles
Trivium (band) songs
Songs written by Matt Heafy
Roadrunner Records singles
2005 songs
Songs written by Corey Beaulieu
Songs written by Travis Smith (musician)
Music videos directed by Dale Resteghini